Coralroot is a common name for several plants which may refer to:
 Members of the orchid genus Corallorhiza
 Mertens' coralroot
 Spotted coralroot
 Spring coralroot
 Striped coralroot
 Yellow coralroot
 Cardamine bulbifera, in the bittercress genus Cardamine